RF Engines Limited of Newport, Isle of Wight, UK was founded in 1999. RF Engines (RFEL) develops (and patents as appropriate) products based on high performance, state-of-the-art, digital signal processing techniques that enable fast moving events or fleeting, hopping signals occurring in the radio spectrum to be identified and acquired in real-time for subsequent analysis. These IP (Intellectual Property) cores are then incorporated into an increasing number of RFEL's own products as well as their customers' products by implementing them into FPGAs (field-programmable gate arrays) mainly from Xilinx and Altera.

RFEL's products have a variety of applications, including in the design of efficient wireless communication (satellite and terrestrial) networks, test and measurement instrumentation, homeland security surveillance systems, bespoke wideband receivers/transceivers and in systems to detect signals from fast moving missiles or other military threats.

Privately owned, it has been profitable for several years and has been steadily growing year on year both in revenue terms and head count, employing over 20 highly qualified designers. RFEL's customers are mainly 'Tier 1' companies in each of its main markets, including Thales, Qinetiq, Max Planck Institute for Radioastronomy (Germany), UK Ministry of Defence, Rheinmetall (Germany), CEA (France), Agilent (Switzerland) and LIG Nex1(Korea), as well as many other major international clients.

As of 2009 RFEL was bought by Rheinmetall and renamed to Rheinmetall Electronics UK.

Academic links
RFEL is sponsoring students focusing on MSc degrees at the University of York with two special awards of £1,500 each that will be presented to graduates of the DSP course – one for 'excellence in theoretical signal processing' and secondly for 'excellence in signal processing design'.

Products
RFEL's first patented design (called the PFT – Pipelined Frequency Transform) is a novel signal processing technique for monitoring the radio spectrum in fine detail, but with the ability to observe the radio spectrum in multiple resolutions simultaneously. The company has gone on to develop an extensive portfolio of patented and proprietary IP that is used to 'build' complex systems on FPGA designs.

Awards
 Smart award in 2002
 Start up of the Year in 2004 European Electronics Industry Award
 Embedded System Innovation of the Year in 2006 Elektra European Electronic Awards
 South East Business Award 2008 for Innovation and Creativity
 Queen's Award for Innovation 2009

References

External links

Companies based on the Isle of Wight